Judith, Lady Montefiore (née Barent Cohen; 20 February 1784 – 24 September 1862) was a British linguist, musician, travel writer, and philanthropist. She was the wife of Sir Moses Montefiore. She authored the first Jewish cook book written in English.

Early years
Judith Barent Cohen, fourth daughter of Levy Barent Cohen and his wife, Lydia Diamantschleifer, was born in London on 20 February 1784. The father, of Angel Court, Throgmorton Street, was a wealthy Ashkenazi or German Jew.

Career
She married Sir Moses Montefiore on 10 June 1812. Marriages between Sephardim and Ashkenazim were not approved by the Portuguese Synagogue; but Moses believed that this caste prejudice was hurtful to the best interests of Judaism, and was desirous of abolishing it. There is little doubt that that marriage did more than anything else to pave the way for the present union of English Jews. They were married on 10 June 1812, and took a house in New Court, St. Swithin's Lane, next door to one Nathan Maier Rothschild, living there for 13 years. This was likely Nathan Mayer Rothschild, founder of the Rothschild banking family of England, whom one of her sisters, Hannah (1783–1850), had married in 1806.

A keen traveller, she noted the distress and suffering around her, more particularly in the "Jewish Quarters" of the towns through which she passed, and was ever ready with some plan of alleviation. Her privately printed journals, threw light upon her character, and showed her to be cultured, imbued with a strong religious spirit, true to the teachings and observances of the Jewish faith, yet exhibiting the widest acceptance of  those espousing other beliefs. She was quick to resent any indignity or insult that might be offered to her religion or her people. 

Her prudence and intelligence influenced all her husband's undertakings, and when he retired from business, the administration of his fortune in philanthropic endeavours was largely directed by her. Lady Montefiore accompanied her husband in all his foreign missions up to 1859, and was the beneficent genius of his memorable expeditions to the Holy Land, Damascus, Saint Petersburg, and Rome. By her linguistic abilities, she was enabled to materially assist her husband in his self-imposed tasks. During the journey to Russia, in 1846, she was indefatigable in her efforts to alleviate the misery she saw everywhere around her. The wife and daughter of the Russian governor paid her a ceremonious visit and expressed the admiration she had inspired among all classes. Her sympathies were greatly widened by travel; two journals of some of these travels were published anonymously by her. It was also during this period that Montefiore authored and had published the first English language Jewish cookbook, The Jewish Manual.

Later years, death and legacy
For some years her health had been so bad that they had spent much of their time in Europe in the hope of improving it, but she had at last become too weak to undertake the journeys, and her last years of her life were spent alternately in London and Ramsgate. Only a few months prior to her decease, the couple had celebrated their golden wedding anniversary, and this period was marked by what seemed a partial restoration of her health.

On 24 September 1862, after exchanging blessings with her husband, she died.

After her death, Sir Moses founded in her memory the Judith Lady Montefiore College at Ramsgate.

References

Attribution

Bibliography
Jew. Chron. 3 October 1863
 Kayserling, Die Judischen Frauen, pp. 272–275, 1308
 Loewe, L. Diaries of Sir Muses and Lady Montefiore, 1890.
 Morals, Eminent Israelites, pp. 240–312
 Wolf, Lucien. Life (of Sir Moses Montefiore), pp. 189–212

External links
 
 

1784 births
1862 deaths
Linguists from England
Musicians from London
English travel writers
British women travel writers
Women linguists
English Jews
Judith
Women cookbook writers
Wives of baronets
19th-century British women writers
Jewish women writers
Jewish linguists
English food writers
Jewish women philanthropists
British Ashkenazi Jews
British people of Dutch-Jewish descent
Cohen family